Mayflower School was founded on 27 January 1956 by Tai Solarin, a Nigerian educator, humanist and civil rights pioneer, who was married to Sheila Mary Tuer, an English woman; they had two children Corin and Tunde Solarin. The school is located on a vast piece of land in Ikenne, Ogun State, Nigeria. It is a 90 acres of land school. Named after the historical Mayflower ship that brought the first batch of pilgrims to the United States. Like the pilgrims, Solarin founded the school in personal rebellion against religious persecution.

Mayflower preaches a very strong educational philosophy grounded in self-reliance, self-sacrifice, public service and physical toughness.  In Solarin's words, the students must be "rugged." Since the school was first established, in the boarding house, female students are forbidden from using any form of cosmetics. A rigorous, military-style living regimen requires that every student wake up at 5:00 am for a round of moderate physical exercise which involved running and in-field stretches. In his days, Dr. Solarin would often be the first to show up for these exercises. He urged his students to always "lead by example."

The school's motto is “Knowledge is Light” and it is noted for the outstanding quality of its graduates, many of whom are leaders in Nigeria and abroad.

Every student is taught the basics of rudimentary and mechanized farming as part of a well rounded, self-sustaining education.

The students wear a uniform styled after Tai Solarin's trademark apparel —simple khaki shorts and short-sleeve shirts. This applies to both male and female students. Graduates of the school are called "Ex-Mays."

The school's sound academic reputation has produced a long record of achievements, including the first national female chemical engineer.

History
When Mayflower School opened on 27 January 1956, it had 70 students, and in 1992, it had 1,900, including more than 800 girls. Tai Solarin was its principal from 1956 to 1976.

In 1962 a team of 13 American college and university students spent June and July at Mayflower under the sponsorship of Operation Crossroads Africa.  The team worked with counterpart students from Wesley College, Ibadan, to construct a building that would serve as a library for the school.  The team was led by the then College Chaplain of Alma College, Alma, Michigan.  As a consequence of the Crossroads experience, a relationship was formed between Alma and Mayflower School.  Between 1963 and 1988, annually, an Alma College student spent the year as a teacher at Mayflower. In the course of the relationship several Mayflower students studied at, and graduated from, Alma College; and Tai Solarin was awarded the college's honorary degree.  The Crossroads and Alma College connection is detailed in Solarin's own history, Mayflower, The Story of a School, (Lagos, Nigeria, John West Publications, 1970).

Notable alumni
Oladapo Afolabi, former Head of Service of the Federation of Nigeria
William Kumuyi, founder Deeper Christian Life Ministry
Dayo Amusa, actress and singer
Richard Bamisile, politician
Tunji Disu, Police Officer
DO2dTUN, on-air personality, video jockey, actor and media entrepreneur
Chude Jideonwo, lawyer, journalist and media entrepreneur
Anthony Joshua, world heavyweight champion boxer
Pepenazi, songwriter, recording artiste and performer
Isio De-laVega Wanogho, supermodel, columnist, painter, and Interior architect

References

External links
 Mayflower School, Ikenne: https://mayflowerprivateschool.com
 Ex-mays on the web: https://web.archive.org/web/20061205032900/http://ex-mays.com/
 Ex-mays on the web - MSN Group: https://web.archive.org/web/20071111005348/http://groups.msn.com/MayflowerSchoolStudents/_whatsnew.msnw
 Ex-mays on the web: https://web.archive.org/web/20080605064452/http://www.exmays.net/
 Alma College: http://www.alma.edu
 Operation Crossroads Africa: http://operationcrossroadsafrica.org/

1956 establishments in Nigeria
Educational institutions established in 1956
Secondary schools in Ogun State